Mangalore Assembly constituency (erstwhile Ullal) is one of the Karnataka Legislative Assemblies or Vidhan Sabha constituencies in Karnataka, India which belongs to Dakshina Kannada Lok Sabha constituency. Mangalore constituency along with Mangalore City South and Mangalore City North represents the Mangalore City.

History 
As per the "delimitation notification" issued by the Union Government in 2007, Vittla Assembly constituency was merged with Mangalore constituency which was previously known as Ullal.

Members of Legislative Assembly

Election results

2018 
Constituency had a total of 5 contestants in 2018 election.

2013 
Constituency had a total of 15 contestants in 2013 election and out of which 7 were independent candidates.

1952

See also 
 Mangalore City South
 Mangalore City North
 Ullal City Municipal
 Ullal

References 

Assembly constituencies of Karnataka
Mangalore